Valkanov is a Bulgarian masculine surname – its feminine counterpart being Valkanova (Вълканова) – and may refer to:
Alexandar Valkanov (1904–1972), Bulgarian botanist and zoologist
Hristo Valkanov (1874–1905), Bulgarian revolutionary
Rossen Valkanov, American economist 
Velko Valkanov (1927–2016), Bulgarian lawyer and politician
Yanko Valkanov (born 1982), Bulgarian footballer

Bulgarian-language surnames